Penbol is a hamlet in the  community of Rhosybol, Ynys Môn, Wales, which is 140.1 miles (225.5 km) from Cardiff and 221.1 miles (355.7 km) from London.

References

See also
List of localities in Wales by population

Villages in Anglesey